Below is a list of songs that topped the RIM charts in 2020 according to the Recording Industry Association of Malaysia.

Chart history

References

External links
Recording Industry Association of Malaysia

2020 in Malaysia
Malaysia
2020